Johnsville Meetinghouse, also known as Johnsville Old German Baptist Meetinghouse, is a historic Old German Baptist Brethren meeting house located near Catawba, Roanoke County, Virginia. It was built in 1874, and is a simple, one story, one room building with five bays and a partial basement.  It has a metal gable roof and features hand-planed clapboard siding and handmade window frames and glass.

It was added to the National Register of Historic Places in 1998.

References

External links
 Johnsville Meetinghouse, 8860 Johnsville Church Road, Catawba, Roanoke, VA at the Historic American Buildings Survey (HABS)

19th-century Baptist churches in the United States
Churches on the National Register of Historic Places in Virginia
Baptist churches in Virginia
Churches completed in 1887
Buildings and structures in Roanoke County, Virginia
National Register of Historic Places in Roanoke County, Virginia
Historic American Buildings Survey in Virginia